Trockenborn-Wolfersdorf is a municipality in the district Saale-Holzland, in Thuringia, Germany.

Wolfersdorf Castle, a hunting lodge of the Dukes of Saxe-Altenburg, received its name Schloss Fröhliche Wiederkunft ("Palace of Happy Returning") when its first owner, John Frederick I, Elector of Saxony, returned there in 1552 to meet his family after a five years absence as a war prisoner. The last Sovereign, Ernst II, Duke of Saxe-Altenburg, died there in 1955 as a citizen of East Germany.

References

Municipalities in Thuringia
Saale-Holzland-Kreis